Georges Émile Jules Daressy (19 March 1864 – 28 February 1938) was a French Egyptologist.

He worked from 1887 in the Egyptian Museum in Cairo. Amongst his responsibilities was the museum's move from Bulaq to Giza in 1891, and then to the present-day location in 1901. He is an author of the general catalog of the museum. He was the first Egyptologist to publish (1901) and translate (1906) the Akhmim wooden tablets.

He excavated throughout Egypt, most notably in the Valley of the Kings, Medinet Habu, Karnak, Luxor, Malkata and Abydos.

Publications
 , Le Caire, 1893.
 , Le Caire, 1897.
 , 1898.
 , Le Caire : , 1901,.
 , Le Caire : , 1902,.
 , Le Caire : , 1903,.
 , Le Caire : Imprimerie de l'Inst. Franc̜ais d'Archéologie Orientale, 1905,.
 , Le Caire : Imprimerie de l'Inst. Franc̜ais d'Archéologie Orientale, 1905–1906,.
  XXVIII, 1906, 62–72.
 , Le Caire : , 1909,.
 The tomb of queen Tîyi : Catalogue of the objects discovered, London, 1910, (Theodore M. Davis' Excavations : Bibân el Molûk).
 A brief description of the principal monuments exhibited in the Egyptian Museum, Cairo, Cairo : Press of the French Institute of Oriental Archaeology, 1922, 3. Auflage 1925.

References

External links
 Akhmim Wooden Tablet

1864 births
1938 deaths
French Egyptologists